Tala Shin Saw Bok was a principal queen of King Binnya E Law of Martaban. She was a daughter of King Hkun Law and sister of Queen Sanda Min Hla. Bok was raised as queen by her half-brother E Law in 1348. The marriage was arranged by her elder sister Sanda Min Hla, who had just put E Law on the throne.

References

Bibliography
 

Queens consort of Hanthawaddy